Never Ever is a 2016 mystery romance film directed by Benoît Jacquot, starring Mathieu Amalric and Julia Roy. Roy also wrote the screenplay for the film, based on Don DeLillo's novel The Body Artist. The film had its world premiere at the 73rd Venice International Film Festival on 9 September 2016.

Plot
A performance artist Laura meets a film director Rey. The two fall in love and get married. After Rey dies of a motorcycle accident, Laura feels alone in her house.

Cast
 Mathieu Amalric as Rey 
 Julia Roy as Laura
 Jeanne Balibar as Isabelle
 Victória Guerra as Marie 	
 Elmano Sancho as the producer
 José Neto as the owner
 Hugo Pedro as journalist

Production
In 2013, it was reported that Luca Guadagnino would direct a film adaptation of Don DeLillo's novel The Body Artist and Isabelle Huppert, Denis Lavant, and David Cronenberg would star in the film. In 2015, it was reported that Benoît Jacquot would direct the film and Mathieu Amalric and Jeanne Balibar would star in the film. In that year, it was reported that Julia Roy had joined the cast. Roy also wrote the screenplay for the film. Filming took place in Portugal.

Release
The film had its world premiere at the 73rd Venice International Film Festival on 9 September 2016.
It was also screened at the 2016 Toronto International Film Festival and the 29th Tokyo International Film Festival. It was released in France on 23 November 2016.

Reception
Guy Lodge of Variety called the film "an enjoyably slinky but disposable divertissement from director Benoit Jacquot that is unlikely to leave viewers quite as haunted as its characters." Neil Young of The Hollywood Reporter commented that "it palpably aspires to be a classily highbrow kind of romantic ghost story with psychological thriller undertones, but falls laughably short of its goals."

References

External links
 
 

2016 films
2010s mystery films
2010s romance films
2010s French-language films
French mystery films
French romance films
Portuguese romance films
Films directed by Benoît Jacquot
Films about film directors and producers
Films about actors
Films based on American novels
Films produced by Paulo Branco
Films scored by Bruno Coulais
2010s French films